Saudi Flag Day, officially the Flag Day, is a public holiday in Saudi Arabia observed annually on March 11 to commemorate the adoption of the unstandardized version of the country's national flag by Ibn Saud in 1937. It was first celebrated on the 86th anniversary of the adoption by King Salman in 2023, designating it as the nation's third non-religious legal holiday after Saudi National Day and Saudi Founding Day to be observed as per the Gregorian calendar.

Overview 

Around Saudi Arabia's unification and proclamation in 1932, Ibn Saud customized the country's green flag by inserting a Scimitar below the Islamic creed. On March 11, 1937, he officially adopted the flag to represent Saudi Arabia internationally. The flag was in official use for 36 years until 1973 when King Faisal standardized it.

On March 1, 2023, the Saudi Press Agency reported that King Salman issued the Royal Decree No. A/303 that designated 11 March as The Flag Day. Ten days later, celebrations were observed across the country. Salman highlighted the importance of Flag Day, citing it as a factor to consolidate national identity.

The cultural ministry organized artistic activities for three days including a theatrical show.

References

Public holidays in Asia